Freeridge is an American teen comedy-drama series created by Lauren Iungerich, Eddie Gonzalez, Jeremy Haft, Jamie Dooner, and Jamie Uyeshiro that premiered on Netflix on February 2, 2023. It is a spin-off of On My Block.

Cast and characters

Main

 Keyla Monterroso Mejia as Gloria, the leader of the friend group
 Bryana Salaz as Ines, Gloria's younger sister
 Tenzing Norgay Trainor as Cameron, the only male in the friend group who is a proud bisexual. He has a boyfriend, but is still hung up on Demi whom he has a crush on since they were 12 years old. 
 Ciara Riley Wilson as Demi, the friend who is interested in spirituality and Cameron's best friend
 Peggy Blow as Mariluna, a woman who is interested in getting the box the friend group have

Recurring

 Zaire Adams as Andre, Cameron's boyfriend
 Paula Garces as Geny, Gloria and Ines' neighbor. Garces reprises her role from On My Block.
 Eric Gutierrez as Ruben, Geny's husband. Gutierrez reprises his role from On My Block.
 JeanPaul SanPedro as Javier, Gloria and Ines' dad who is a widower
 J.R. Villarreal as Tonio, Gloria and Ines' uncle and Javier's brother
 Michael Solomon as Rusty, a new classmate of Gloria and Ines' whom Tonio hired as an assistant

Episodes

Production
On September 27, 2021, a spin-off of On My Block, titled as Freeridge was ordered to series by Netflix. It is created and executive produced by Lauren Iungerich, Eddie Gonzalez, Jeremy Haft, Jamie Dooner, and Jamie Uyeshiro. On October 8, 2021, Bryana Salaz, Keyla Monterroso Mejia, Ciara Riley Wilson, and Shiv Pai were cast to star. On November 4, 2022, Tenzing Norgay Trainor and Peggy Blow joined the cast in undisclosed capacities. The series was filmed from May 9 to July 5, 2022 in Los Angeles. On December 16, 2022, it was reported that Michael Solomon was cast to star and Trainor is part of the starring cast. The series was released on February 2, 2023.

Reception
The review aggregator website Rotten Tomatoes reported an 80% approval rating with an average rating of 6.8/10, based on 10 critic reviews. Metacritic, which uses a weighted average, assigned a score of 77 out of 100 based on 4 critics, indicating "generally favorable reviews".

References

External links 
 
 

2020s American high school television series
2020s American teen drama television series
2020s American comedy-drama television series
2023 American television series debuts
American television spin-offs
English-language Netflix original programming
Television series about teenagers
Television shows set in Los Angeles